Group A of the 2002 Fed Cup Americas Zone Group II was one of two pools in the Americas Zone Group II of the 2002 Fed Cup. Six teams competed in a round robin competition, with the top team advancing to Group I in 2003.

El Salvador vs. Bermuda

Dominican Republic vs. Bolivia

Chile vs. Panama

El Salvador vs. Chile

Dominican Republic vs. Panama

Bolivia vs. Bermuda

El Salvador vs. Bolivia

Dominican Republic vs. Chile

Panama vs. Bermuda

El Salvador vs. Dominican Republic

Bolivia vs. Panama

Chile vs. Bermuda

El Salvador vs. Panama

Dominican Republic vs. Bermuda

Bolivia vs. Chile

  placed first in the pool, and thus advanced to Group I in 2003, where they placed second in their pool of four.

See also
Fed Cup structure

References

External links
 Fed Cup website

2002 Fed Cup Americas Zone